Gaston Waringhien (July 20, 1901 – December 20, 1991) was a French linguist, lexicographer, and Esperantist. He wrote poems as well as essays and books on linguistics. He was chairman of the Akademio de Esperanto.

Books
 Plena Vortaro (1930)
 Plena Ilustrita Vortaro (1970)

Other works
 Parnasa gvidlibro (with Kálmán Kalocsay, 1932) 
 Kontribuo al poemkolekto Dekdu Poetoj, 1934
 Plena (analiza) gramatiko (with Kálmán Kalocsay, 1935, 1938, 1981)
 Facilaj esperantaj legajhoj (redaction, 1935)
 Maximes de La Rochefoucauld (translation, 1935)
 Leteroj de L.L.Zamenhof (redaction, 1948)
 Poemoj de Omar Kajam (translation, 1953)
 Eseoj I: Beletro (1956)
 La floroj de l' malbono ("Les fleurs du mal" (The flowers of evil) by Charles Baudelaire, translator and redactor, 1957)
 Kantoj kaj romancoj (translation with Kálmán Kalocsay)
 La trofeoj (translation 1977)
 Tra la parko de la franca poezio: La renesanca periodo / La klasika periodo (translations, 1977/1980)
 La ĥimeroj (translations, 1976)
 Lingvo kaj vivo (essays, 1969)
 Ni kaj ĝi (essays, 1972)
 1887 kaj la sekvo (essays, 1980)
 Kaj la ceter' - nur literaturo (essays, 1983) 
 Duonvoĉe (original poems, 1939 and 1963)

1901 births
1991 deaths
Linguists from France
Writers of Esperanto literature
Translators to Esperanto
Akademio de Esperanto members
Esperanto lexicographers
French Esperantists
20th-century translators
20th-century linguists
20th-century lexicographers